"Merry Xmas Everybody" is a song by the British rock band Slade, released as a non-album single in 1973. The song was written by lead vocalist Noddy Holder and bassist Jim Lea, and it was produced by Chas Chandler. It was the band's sixth and final number-one single in the UK. Earning the UK Christmas number one slot in December 1973, the song beat another Christmas-themed song, Wizzard's "I Wish It Could Be Christmas Everyday", which reached fourth place. It remained in the charts for nine weeks until February 1974.

Released at the peak of the band's popularity, "Merry Xmas Everybody" sold over a million copies upon its first release. It is Slade's last number-one single and by far their best-selling single. It has been released during every decade since 1973 and has been covered by numerous artists. The single was certified double platinum by British Phonographic Industry (BPI) in December 2021. Since 2007 and the advent of downloads counting towards the UK Singles Chart, it has re-entered the charts each December. As of December 2012, it had sold 1.32 million copies in the UK.

In a UK television special on ITV in December 2012, "Merry Xmas Everybody" was voted third (behind "Fairytale of New York" and "I Wish It Could Be Christmas Everyday") in The Nation's Favourite Christmas Song.

According to the Fan Club Newsletter for January and February 1974, the song was awarded a Silver Disc for pre-order sales. Within the first week of release, the single had sold 500,000 copies. Also, according to the same newsletter, "Merry Xmas Everybody" was in such big demand that Polydor records had to make special arrangements to have 250,000 discs sent from Los Angeles, as well as 30,000 copies a day they were receiving from Germany.

History and background
By 1973, Slade were one of the most popular bands in Britain, having achieved two number-one singles—"Cum On Feel The Noize" and "Skweeze Me Pleeze Me"—in three months. These singles had both entered the charts straight at number one, a feat unheard of since The Beatles with "Get Back" in 1969. During the year, manager Chas Chandler suggested that Slade write and record a Christmas song. Although the other band members were initially against the idea, Lea came up with the basis of the song while taking a shower. After coming up with the verse melody, Lea recalled a song Holder had discarded in 1967, which he had written when the band were named the 'N Betweens. Entitled "Buy Me a Rocking Chair", it was Holder's first solo work. "Merry Xmas Everybody" used the melody of this song for the chorus, with Lea's melody as the verse. Speaking to Record Mirror in 1984, Lea revealed: 

After an evening out drinking at a pub in Wolverhampton, Holder worked through the night at his mother's house in Walsall to write the lyrics, which he completed in one draft.

Holder presented his lyrics to Lea, and the pair played the song to Chandler on acoustic guitars. Slade then set off on a sell-out tour. Ten weeks before the song was recorded, drummer Don Powell was injured in a car accident. His girlfriend Angela Morris was killed, and Powell remained in a coma for almost a week. After his eventual recovery, he was able to join the band to record the song. In 2009, PRS for Music announced that up to forty-two percent of the world's population could have listened to the song.

Recording

The song was recorded in the late summer of 1973, partway through Slade's east coast US tour, at the Record Plant in New York, where John Lennon had just finished working on his album Mind Games. "Merry Xmas Everybody" took five days to finish, but the band disliked the first completed version. It ended up being re-recorded, with the corridor outside used to record the chorus, as it provided an appropriate echo.

In a 1984 interview with Record Mirror, Lea recalled of the song's recording: 

In 2018, Jim Lea spoke of the recording of the song in a Slade Forum Q&A: "The seasonal epic, as you call it, was recorded with me full of high anxiety. Don couldn’t remember anything and no-one would rehearse it with me. They were against the idea. What you hear on the track is me playing bass, acoustic guitar, piano and harmonium as the track was built out of thin air, through lack of rehearsal. Dave conceded to play electric guitar. Poor Don looked on in horror as he drummed a single rhythm just to get it down. I knew it was good, but there was only one player in the team. Everything I tried out is on the record as Dennis Faranti (engineer) liked all the ideas I had. I dreaded hearing the mix, as we were on the road, while Chas and Dennis mixed it. I was relieved when I heard what was born from STRESS."

Composition
"Merry Xmas Everybody" opens with the introduction using a B♭ triad, a 7-second melody consisting of a harmonium and bass. The first verse then emerges in G major. This is followed by the bridge then the chorus. This sequence is then repeated once, and followed by a solo part sung by Holder (What will your daddy do/when he sees your mamma kissin' Santa Claus). The first sequence is then repeated, with the final chorus sung four times. On the last rendition, Holder screams out "IT'S CHRISTMAS!!!!" after the Everybody's having fun line and over the rest of the chorus; the final part decreases its tempo and fades out to a D major chord played by the harmonium.

Release

Before its release, "Merry Xmas Everybody" received about half a million advance orders. 350,000 copies were bought upon its release. It became the third song by Slade to enter the UK Singles Chart at number one in its first eligible week on 15 December 1973, the sixth number one of their career, and the fastest selling single in the UK. Polydor, Slade's record label, were forced to use their French pressing plant to keep up with the demand, and the song eventually went on to sell over one million copies, becoming the Christmas number one of 1973, beating another Christmas-themed song, "I Wish It Could Be Christmas Everyday" by Wizzard. "Merry Xmas Everybody" remained number one until mid-January, and stayed in the Top 50 for nine weeks. That it remained in the charts after Christmas caused confusion for Holder, who wondered why people continued to buy it.

The single's original B-side was "Don't Blame Me", which later appeared as an album track on their 1974 album Old New Borrowed and Blue. In a 1979 fan club interview, Lea said: ""Don't Blame Me" was a time-filler, I think that it was created as that. When it was used as a b-side, we didn't even know it was being used, it was chosen by the offices. We were in America recording the Christmas single, there was a rush to choose what to put on the back of it, and that track happened to be used."

In 1985, the song was given its first 12" vinyl release. An extended remix version of the song was created by Lea and Peter Hammond for the release. In 1989, it received its first release as a CD single, which sold 15,000 copies in the UK. That same year, the song was sampled by the novelty pop music act Jive Bunny and the Mastermixers for their song "Let's Party". "Let's Party" would reach No. 1 in the UK, and was also a success across Europe.

Promotion
No promotional video was created for the single as the band focused on extensive TV work over the Christmas period instead. They performed the song on various shows including Top of the Pops, The Les Dawson Christmas Show and Lift Off with Ayshea.

The band later performed the song again on Top of the Pops in 1983 on 22 December, and on Dutch TV while promoting the 1983 single "My Oh My". In 1985, Holder and Lea performed a short acoustic version on the UK show Razamatazz while promoting the single "Do You Believe in Miracles". The band mimed the song on Pebble Mill at One in 1991 while promoting the band's final single "Universe".

The song was given an animated music video which premiered on the band's YouTube channel on 9 December 2021, which was directed and animated by Matthew Robins.

A visualizer for the song was released on 24 February 2022 on the band's YouTube channel.

Critical reception
Upon release, Record Mirror stated: "When Slade get hold of a Christmas song, inevitably it's something different. Holder and Lea, that well known tunesmith duo, here on a gentler, more melodic, less rumbustious, guaranteed number one than usual." Disc commented: "There is no doubt that this slice of festive cheer will be a huge monster hit: the main question is whether it'll go straight to number one..." Sounds said: "Noddy is in particularly fine voice and there's also some super-neat thumping bass." Melody Maker described the song as "another stomper" and "highly danceable".

Legacy
"Merry Xmas Everybody" is played regularly at UK nightclubs and on TV or radio stations and in many supermarkets around Christmas. It is included on numerous Christmas-themed compilation albums and several of Slade's subsequent compilation albums. Despite the song's popularity it became the band's last number-one hit.  The song charted in every year in the early half of the 1980s, and again in 1998 and every year since  2006. Peter Buckley describes the song in The Rough Guide To Rock as "arguably the best Christmas single ever". This opinion was reflected in a 2007 poll carried out by MSN Music, where it was voted the UK's most popular Christmas song. But even so, the song is virtually never played in the United States, having not been released as a single there in 1973.  In the United States this song does, however, get played on Muzak.

It can be heard playing in the background during six episodes of the British television programme Doctor Who: "The Christmas Invasion" (2005) in Mickey Smith's garage, "The Runaway Bride" (2006) at Donna's first wedding reception, "Turn Left" (2008) inside a pub, "The End of Time" (2009) in Donna's house, "The Power of Three" (2012) in a hospital and "Last Christmas" (2014) to keep a woman distracted from the monsters in the episode.

It also can be heard at the beginning of NCIS: Los Angeles season 1 episode 10 - Brimstone.

The song has also become the last song that Mark Radcliffe and Stuart Maconie play before Christmas on their BBC Radio 6 Music show, and on a number of occasions Noddy Holder has been a guest on the show to introduce it.

Noddy Holder has referred to the song as his pension scheme, reflecting its continuing popularity and the royalties it generates. In 2015 it was estimated that the song generates £500,000 of royalties per year. The song has been credited with popularizing the annual race for the UK Christmas Number One Single.

Cover versions
In 1981, British working-class band The 4-Skins recorded a version for the various artists compilation E.P. Bollocks to Christmas.
In 1987, British rock band The Cure performed the song live as the last song of the last encore of their three-night stand at Wembley Arena on 9 December 1987, the last night of The Kissing Tour.  
In 1990, glam rock tribute band The Metal Gurus released a cover of the song as a charity single. Their version was produced by Holder and Lea and reached No. 55 in the UK. Sales of the single raised proceeds for the Childline charity.
In 1998, Swedish dance duo Flush released a dance remix under the name "Slade vs Flush". It reached No. 30 in the UK.
In 1998, the Spice Girls did a cover and played this song on their Christmas in Spiceworld tour.
In 2000, British dance-pop group Steps recorded a version for the various artists compilation Platinum Christmas.
In 2000, British rock band Oasis recorded an acoustic version for The Royle Family Christmas Special.  It was later released on the 2002 various artists compilation NME in Association with War Child Presents 1 Love.
In 2005, girl group Girls Aloud included a cover version as the closing track on the bonus disc of Christmas songs issued as a limited edition of their Chemistry album.
In 2005, British singer Tony Christie covered the song and released it as a single on Amarillo Records. It reached No. 49 in the UK.
In 2007, American rock band R.E.M. released their own version of the song as a Christmas fan club single.
In 2010, Glenn Gregory of Heaven 17 performed an acoustic version of the track on Paul Morley's Christmas Songs.
In 2010, American singer-songwriter Brendan Benson performed a version of the song in December for The A.V. Club Holiday Undercover series. Later, in the same series, English singer-songwriter Kate Nash also covered the song.
In 2012, Canadian rock band Sloan released their own version of the song as a free download.
In 2012, Belgian pop punk band The Rocket covered the song for Belgian radio station MNM.
In 2015, American rock band Train covered the song for their album Christmas in Tahoe.
In 2017, American rock band Cheap Trick covered the song on their album Christmas Christmas.
In 2017, British progressive rock band IQ covered the song  on their limited edition album Tales from a Dark Christmas
1 November 2019 saw the single release of American Celtic rock band Prydein's version with a video and digital release
1 November 2019; singer-songwriter Robbie Williams covered the song for his album The Christmas Present.  It features Jamie Cullum.
On 15 November 2019, American rock band I Don't Know How But They Found Me covered the song on their EP Christmas Drag. An official music video was released three days later.
On 27 November 2020, Dr Phunk covered a hardstyle version on the EP Home Alone (On the Night Before Christmas).
On 11 December 2020, English indie pop band Bastille covered the song as part of the Google Nest Audio Sessions.
On 18 December 2020, German power metal band Blind Guardian covered the song.

Formats and track listings
7" single
"Merry Xmas Everybody" – 3:26
"Don't Blame Me" – 2:40

12" single (1985 reissue)
"Merry Xmas Everybody (Extended version)" – 5:17
"Don't Blame Me" – 2:40

CD single (1989 reissue)
"Merry Xmas Everybody" – 3:23
"Don't Blame Me" – 2:40
"Far Far Away" – 3:33

CD single (1993 German reissue)
"Merry Xmas Everybody" – 3:23
"My Friend Stan" - 2:38
"Cum On Feel the Noize" – 4:18

CD single (Slade vs. Flush '98 remix)
"Merry Xmas Everybody '98 Remix (Flush Edit)" – 3:44
"Merry Xmas Everybody (Original version)" – 3:26
"Cum On Feel the Noize" – 4:23

CD single (2006 reissue)
"Merry Xmas Everybody" – 3:26
"Cum On Feel the Noize" – 4:23

Personnel
Slade
Noddy Holder – lead vocals, rhythm guitar
Dave Hill – lead guitar, backing vocals
Jim Lea – bass, harmonium, backing vocals
Don Powell – drums

Additional personnel
Chas Chandler – production

Charts

Certifications and sales

See also
Christmas music in the United Kingdom and Ireland

References

External links
 "Merry Xmas Everybody" Official Music video
 "Merry Xmas Everybody" Audio video

1973 singles
1973 songs
1990 singles
1998 singles
2006 singles
British Christmas songs
Irish Singles Chart number-one singles
Slade songs
Tony Christie songs
Songs written by Noddy Holder
Songs written by Jim Lea
Song recordings produced by Chas Chandler
Song recordings produced by Xenomania
UK Singles Chart number-one singles
Polydor Records singles
Amarillo Records singles
Mercury Records singles
Animated music videos